Oak Hill Cricket Club Ground is a cricket ground in Kilbride, County Wicklow, Ireland.

History
The ground was constructed in 2008 by businessman Peter Savill on his stud farm at Kilbride. The ground was officially opened on 22 June 2008, with an Ireland XI playing a Lashings XI. The pavilion at the ground is an exact replica of the one found at Ampleforth College in England, where Savill was educated. First-class cricket was first played at the ground in 2012, when Ireland played South Africa A. The ground was scheduled to host two Twenty20 matches as part of the tour, however both matches were cancelled due to rain. The future of the ground was called into question in 2013, when residents of a neighbouring property took legal action in the High Court after complaining about excess noise from the venue. The ground hosted a first-class match between Leinster Lightning and North West Warriors in 2017 Inter-Provincial Championship, which was the inaugural domestic first-class match to be played in Leinster.

Records

First-class
 Highest team total: 365 by Leinster Lightning v North West Warriors, 2017
 Lowest team total: 202 by Ireland v South Africa A, 2012
 Highest individual innings: 156 by Ed Joyce for Leinster Lightning v North West Warriors, 2017
 Best bowling in an innings: 7-56 by Wayne Parnell for South Africa A v Ireland, 2012
 Best bowling in a match: 8-120 by George Dockrell for Leinster Lightning v North West Warriors, 2017

See also
List of Leinster Lightning grounds
List of cricket grounds in Ireland

References

External links

Cricket grounds in the Republic of Ireland
Sports venues in County Wicklow
Sports venues completed in 2008
2008 establishments in Ireland
21st-century architecture in the Republic of Ireland